Henry Smith Farm, also known as Hidden Spring Farm, is a historic home, barn, and vaulted cellar located at Middletown, Dauphin County, Pennsylvania.  The house was built in 1806 as a two-story, five bay, double pile brownstone building in the Federal style.  The interior has a center hall plan in the Georgian style.  A two-story kitchen addition was built in 1840.  The brownstone bank barn was built in 1845–1847.  Located near the house is a vaulted cellar built of rubble stone.

It was added to the National Register of Historic Places in 1988.

References

Houses on the National Register of Historic Places in Pennsylvania
Barns on the National Register of Historic Places in Pennsylvania
Federal architecture in Pennsylvania
Georgian architecture in Pennsylvania
Houses completed in 1806
Houses in Dauphin County, Pennsylvania
Historic districts on the National Register of Historic Places in Pennsylvania
Barns in Pennsylvania
National Register of Historic Places in Dauphin County, Pennsylvania
Farms on the National Register of Historic Places in Pennsylvania